Elizabeth Uber (2 June 1906 – 30 April 1983, born Elizabeth Corbin) was an English badminton and tennis player.

Career
Betty Uber won 13 titles at the All England Open Badminton Championships, 1 of them in women's singles, 4 in women's doubles and 8 in mixed doubles.

She was inducted into the World Badminton Hall of Fame as an Inaugural Member.

Personal life
In 1925, she married Herbert Uber.

Uber Cup
Her surname "Uber" is used for the Uber Cup, the world women's team badminton championship, because she had the idea of hosting the women's event similar to men in New Zealand back in 1950. She also made the draw for the 1956-1957 inaugural tournament, which took place at Lytham St. Annes in Lancashire, England.

Career wins

Tennis
In addition to badminton Uber also competed in tennis and played at the Wimbledon Championships in singles and doubles between 1929 and 1946. Her best singles performance was in 1930 when she reached the fourth round in which she lost to seventh-seeded Phyllis Mudford.

References

English female badminton players
1906 births
1983 deaths
English female tennis players
British female tennis players
Place of birth missing